James Waterston (born January 17, 1969) is an American actor whose first role was playing Gerard Pitts in the 1989 film Dead Poets Society.

Personal life
Waterston grew up in New York City, the son of actor Sam Waterston and Barbara Rutledge Johns. His father later remarried, making Waterston the older half-brother of actresses Elisabeth Waterston and Katherine Waterston, and filmmaker Graham Waterston.

Waterston studied at Yale, where he was a member of The Society of Orpheus and Bacchus, an all-male a cappella group. While still in college, but having already appeared in films and television, he formed the theater company Malaparte with numerous friends, including Ethan Hawke and Robert Sean Leonard. During the 1991 to 2000 life of Malaparte, Waterston and his colleagues did everything from directing to taking tickets. Waterston also formed an improv/sketch group called Circus Maximus.

Career
Waterston first came to attention playing Gerard Pitts in the 1989 film Dead Poets Society. While much of his screen work has been in television productions, he did appear in the 2015 film And It Was Good, working with his father Sam and sister Katherine.

Waterston has a number of stage credits, such as the lead role in the 2011 world premiere of Chinglish, by David Henry Hwang, at Chicago's Goodman Theatre. He has starred in many off-Broadway plays in New York City, and New England.

Like other New York City based actors, Waterston has appeared in different roles across the Law & Order television franchise over the years.  He played a doctor in the Law & Order 1999 episode, "Refuge (Part II)". He also appeared on Law & Order: Special Victims Unit, in the 2008 episode "Inconceivable", as a husband whose wife couldn't conceive without in-vitro fertilization. He returned to Law & Order: Special Victims Unit, in the 2017 episode “Real Fake News”, playing Congressman Luke Bolton, who gets falsely accused of soliciting underage girls.

Waterston has numerous other appearances on episodes of television dramas, such as Diagnosis: Murder, The Good Wife, The Blacklist and others. He played the role of Rev. David Grantland in three made-for-television movies that served as a wrap-up to the Christy television series: Christy: Return to Cutter Gap (2000) and the two-part Christy, Choices of the Heart (2001) (part 1: Christy: A Change of Seasons and part 2: Christy: A New Beginning).

Waterston is on the Board of Directors of Providence Magazine, with circulation in Rhode Island, Connecticut, and Massachusetts, and has contributed photographs to the magazine. His mother, Barbara Waterston, is the editor of the magazine.

Filmography

Film

Television

References

External links
 

1969 births
20th-century American male actors
21st-century American male actors
American male child actors
American male film actors
American male television actors
American male stage actors
Living people
Male actors from New York City
Yale University alumni